James Richard Thomson (February 23, 1927 – May 18, 1991) was a Canadian professional ice hockey player. Thomson played nearly 800 games in the National Hockey League (NHL) from 1945 to 1958 with the Toronto Maple Leafs and Chicago Black Hawks. Thomson was a member of four Stanley Cup championship teams with Toronto and also served as captain of the team. After helping to organize a players' association for the NHL players, Thomson earned the ire of Toronto Maple Leafs' owner Conn Smythe, after which Thomson vowed to never play again for the Maple Leafs. He was traded to Chicago in the off-season and he played one season in Chicago to finish his career. He then went into business.

Playing career
Born in Winnipeg, Thomson was signed by the Toronto Maple Leafs and headed to Toronto at the age of 16 to play junior hockey with the St. Michael's Majors, a Leafs affiliate in the Ontario Hockey Association. After two seasons at St. Mike's, he spent most of the 1945–46 season with the Pittsburgh Hornets in the American Hockey League before joining the Maple Leafs on a full-time basis the next year. He won the Stanley Cup with Toronto in 1947, 1948, 1949 and 1951. He and teammate Gus Mortson were known in Toronto as the "Gold Dust Twins".

At the beginning of the 1956–57 season, Thomson was named team captain, succeeding veteran Sid Smith who gave up the title after his offensive production plummeted during his one season as captain the previous year. Thomson's time with the C would be brief, as it was handed back to former captain Ted Kennedy when he made a comeback after retiring at the end of the 1954–55 season.

That same season, Thomson became one of the leaders of Ted Lindsay's attempt to have a players' association formed, hoping to improve players' conditions and especially to improve player pensions. Thomson was secretary–treasurer of the association and led the organizational drive within the Maple Leafs, which resulted in every member of the team except Kennedy wanting to join the association. Thomson's activities didn't go over well with Maple Leafs' president Conn Smythe, who called him disloyal, revealed his salary dating back to junior, and took him off the team during the season. At the end of the season, Thomson announced to the press that he had played his last game for Smythe and would never play hockey for Toronto ever again. During the off-season, he was sold to the Chicago Black Hawks after twelve years with the Maple Leafs. Lindsay was also traded to Chicago at the same time.

Thomson played one season in Chicago and retired in 1958 at age 31. He accepted work at his father-in-law's coal and oil company while playing for the Maple Leafs and went into the business full-time following his playing career. Thomson died of a heart attack in 1991.

Awards and achievements 
Memorial Cup championship (1945)
NHL Second All-Star team (1951 and 1952)
Played in NHL All-Star Game (1947, 1948, 1949, 1950, 1951, 1952 and 1953)
Stanley Cup championships (1947, 1948, 1949 and 1951)
"Honoured Member" of the Manitoba Hockey Hall of Fame

Career statistics

References

External links

1927 births
1991 deaths
Canadian ice hockey defencemen
Chicago Blackhawks players
Ice hockey people from Winnipeg
Pittsburgh Hornets players
Stanley Cup champions
Toronto Maple Leafs players
Toronto St. Michael's Majors players